N. Kesavan (d. 2011) was an Indian politician and founder of Sri Manakula Vinayagar Educational Trust, from Puducherry. He served as Member of the Legislative Assembly from Lawspet assembly constituency from 1996 to 2001. He was appointed as Government Whip in Puducherry Legislative Assembly during his tenure.

Sri Manakula Vinayagar Educational Trust 
N. Kesavan is the founder of Sri Manakula Vinayagar Educational Trust which runs many colleges in Puducherry.

About Trust 
In 1996, N. Kesavan, formed Sri Manakula Vinayagar Educational Trust with a view to provide technical and medical education to the weaker sections of the society. After the death of the founder the trust is now headed by its chairman and managing director

Institutions 
The following institutions have been started and are functioning successfully till date.
 Sri Manakula Vinayagar Engineering College, Madagadipet, Puducherry
 Manakula Vinayagar Institute of Technology, Kalitheerthalkuppam, Madagadipet, Puducherry
 Sri Manakula Vinayagar Medical College & Hospital, Kalitheerthalkuppam, Madagadipet, Puducherry
 Sri Manakula Vinayagar Nursing College, Kalitheerthalkuppam, Madagadipet, Puducherry
 Sri Manakula Vinayagar Polytechnic College, Kalitheerthalkuppam, Madagadipet, Puducherry
 Venkateswara College of Education & Teacher Training Institute, Kalitheerthalkuppam, Madagadipet, Puducherry
Sri Manakula Vinayagar School of Arts and Science College
Sri Manakula Vinayagar School of Allied Health Sciences
College of Physiotherapy
School of Agriculture

Mailam Subramania Swamy Educational Trust 
Kesavan was also the founder of Mailam Subramania Swamy Educational Trust which was established in 1996. Mailam Engineering College is an institution formed under this trust.

References 

Puducherry politicians
2011 deaths
Indian philanthropists
Year of birth missing
Date of death missing